Mount Kinesava is a  sandstone mountain summit located in Zion National Park, in Washington County of southwest Utah, United States.

Description

Precipitation runoff from this mountain drains into tributaries of the Virgin River. Its nearest higher neighbor is The West Temple,  to the northeast. Other notable mountains wthin view from the summit include The Watchman  to the east-southeast, Bridge Mountain  to the east-northeast, and Mount Spry is positioned  to the northeast. This feature's name was officially adopted in 1934 by the U.S. Board on Geographic Names. It is so named for Kinesava, the Paiute deity of trickery.

Climate
Spring and fall are the most favorable seasons to visit Mount Kinesava. According to the Köppen climate classification system, it is located in a Cold semi-arid climate zone, which is defined by the coldest month having an average mean temperature below , and at least 50% of the total annual precipitation being received during the spring and summer.

Geology

Stratification of sandstone deposits from vast dune fields laid down 175 to 200 million years ago can be seen exposed on the south aspect of the mountain. The uppermost 1,500 feet of this mountain is composed of light-colored Jurassic Navajo Sandstone. Below that layer is deep-red sandstone of the Kayenta Formation, probably best known for its dinosaur tracks, overlying the Springdale Sandstone Member. Continuing lower are the Whitmore Point Member and Dinosaur Canyon Member of the Moenave Formation. Near the base is the Petrified Forest Member of the Chinle Formation, surrounded by landslide deposits.

Gallery

See also

 Geology of the Zion and Kolob canyons area
 Markagunt Plateau

References

External links

 Zion National Park National Park Service
 Weather: Mount Kinesava
 Mt. Kinesava Rock Climbing: mountainproject.com

Climbing areas of the United States
Mountains of Utah
Mountains of Washington County, Utah
North American 2000 m summits
Zion National Park